Nallappan Mohanraj (நல்லப்பன் மோகன்ராஜ், Nallappan Mohanraj; born 23 February 1989 in Namakkal, Tamil Nadu) is an Indian footballer. He is currently playing for Churchill Brothers in the l-League as a left back

Early career
Born in Namakkal, Tamil Nadu, Mohanraj started Playing for Sports Authority of India in Chennai. He went for the under-16 and under-19 state selections, and didn't get selected for either. After that, he went for a trial at the Tata Football Academy, and didn't get through. But Carlton Chapman, the assistant coach there, told me he had a good left foot, and sent him for a trial at (I-League 2nd Division side) HAL, Bangalore. Finally, the HAL coach Krishnaji Rao gave him chance.

Career
After his stint at HAL, Mohanraj signed for Mohun Bagan at the beginning of the 2007-08 season. He enjoyed a very successful stint with Mohun Bagan where he won the Indian Federation Cup in 2008, followed up with the ONGC Super Cup and runner-up in the I-League in 2009. In 2012-13 with Pune F.C. he picked up yet another I-League runner up medal.

Sporting Goa
On 5 February 2014 Mohanraj signed for Sporting Clube de Goa on loan from Mumbai Tigers as their club was disbanded. He made his debut for Sporting Goa on 16 February 2014 in the I-League match against Pune F.C. at the Balewadi Sports Complex in which he started and played the whole match and also earned a yellow card in the 66th minute as Sporting Goa drew the match 1-1.

International
Mohanraj won the 2009 Nehru Cup with the India national team.
He was also the captain of the India U-18 team that toured Germany and played against the Academy teams of VfB Stuttgart, FC Augsburg and Munich 1860, before participating in the 2008 AFC U-19 Championship tournament in Iran.
On 23 February 2011 Mohanraj played his first game for the Indian U23 team against Myanmar.

Honours

India
 SAFF Championship runner-up: 2013

Atlético de Kolkata
Indian Super League: 2014

References

External links
 
 Profile at Goal.com
 

Indian footballers
1989 births
Living people
People from Namakkal district
Footballers from Tamil Nadu
I-League players
Hindustan Aeronautics Limited S.C. players
Mohun Bagan AC players
Pune FC players
Mumbai Tigers FC players
Sporting Clube de Goa players
Indian Super League players
ATK (football club) players
Association football fullbacks
India youth international footballers
India international footballers